Endre Rózsa (30 October 1941, Pécs, Hungary – 18 April 1995, Budapest) was an Attila József and Gábor Bethlen award-winning poet and poet laureate. He was one of the nine members of the Kilencek group of notable Hungarian poets.

Poetry books
1970: Kavicsszüret
1974: Senki ideje
1979: Kietlen ünnep
1985: Sárkányeregető (gyerekversek)
1987: Az anyag emlékezete
1989: Szomjúság örökmécsei
1993: Árnyékszobrok (válogatott és új versek)
1998: Az ámokfutó álmai (hátrahagyott versek)

Achievements 
 1979: Atilla József award
 1994: Magyar Köztársaság Érdemrend Középkeresztje a Kilenceknek
 2009: Bethlen Gábor-díj a Kilenceknek (posztumusz)

References 

1941 births
1995 deaths
Hungarian male poets
People from Pécs
20th-century Hungarian male writers
20th-century Hungarian poets